Pterostylis aciculiformis, commonly known as the needle-point rustyhood or slender ruddyhood, is a plant in the orchid family Orchidaceae and is endemic to south-eastern Australia. It has a rosette of leaves and up to ten green and brown flowers with a brown, insect-like labellum. It is widespread and locally common in New South Wales and Victoria, growing mostly in drier forests.

Description
Pterostylis aciculiformis, is a terrestrial,  perennial, deciduous, herb with an underground tuber. Three to six stem leaves are wrapped around the flowering spike. The lateral sepals turn downwards, curve forwards and are narrower than the hood. The "head" end is swollen, there are 6 to 12 white bristles on each side and many short bristles on the "tail" end. Flowering occurs from September to December.

Taxonomy and naming
The needle-point rustyhood was first formally described in 1936 by William Nicholls who gave it the name Pterostylis pusilla var. aciculiformis and published the description in The Victorian Naturalist. In 1989, Mark Clements and David Jones raised it to species status. The specific epithet (aciculiformis) is derived from the Latin word acicula meaning "a small pin" and the suffix -formis.

Distribution and habitat
Pterostylis aciculiformis occurs in disjunct populations south from Wellington in New South Wales and across northern Victoria, growing mostly in drier forests in stony soils. It may also occur in far eastern South Australia.

References

aciculiformis
Endemic orchids of Australia
Orchids of New South Wales
Orchids of Victoria (Australia)
Plants described in 1936